Poly Sci is the debut solo studio album by American hip hop musician John Forté. It was released on June 23, 1998 on Ruffhouse Records. Recording sessions took place at Booga Basement Studio in East Orange, at Chung King Studios, at The Hit Factory and at The Crib in New York, at Joe's Room in Conshohocken, and at Mayfair Studios in London. Production was primarily handled by Forté himself, as well as Minnesota, Pras, Salaam Remi, Warren Riker and Wyclef Jean.

Track listing

Sample credits
Track 2 contains elements from "Petit Pays" written by Fernando Da Cruz and performed by Cesária Évora
Track 3 contains elements from "Mash It Up" written by Joseph Williams & Lawrence Parker and performed by Just-Ice and resung elements from "99 Luftballons" written by Jörn-Uwe Fahrenkrog-Petersen & Carlo Karges and performed by Nena
Track 7 contains elements from "Cruisin'" written by William Robinson & Marvin Tarplin and performed by Smokey Robinson

Charts

References

External links

1998 debut albums
John Forté albums
Ruffhouse Records albums
Albums produced by Salaam Remi
Albums produced by Wyclef Jean
Albums recorded at Chung King Studios